Structural elements are used in structural analysis to split a complex structure into simple elements. Within a structure, an element cannot be broken down (decomposed) into parts of different kinds (e.g., beam or column).

Structural elements can be lines, surfaces or volumes.

Line elements:

Rod - axial loads
Beam - axial and bending loads
Pillar
Post (structural)
Struts or Compression members- compressive loads
Ties, Tie rods, eyebars, guy-wires, suspension cables, or wire ropes - tension loads

Surface elements:

membrane - in-plane loads only
shell - in plane and bending moments
Concrete slab
deck
shear panel - shear loads only

Volumes:

Axial, shear and bending loads for all three dimensions

See also
 Load-bearing wall
 Post and lintel
 Stressed member engine

References

Structural analysis
Hardware (mechanical)